Mohammed Al-Harthi (born August 12, 1994) is a Saudi Arabian professional footballer who currently plays as a striker for Al-Qaisumah.

References

Living people
1994 births
Saudi Arabian footballers
Saudi Arabia youth international footballers
Al-Ahli Saudi FC players
Al Batin FC players
Al-Mujazzal Club players
Al-Jabalain FC players
Al-Qaisumah FC players
Saudi Professional League players
Saudi First Division League players
Footballers at the 2014 Asian Games
Association football forwards
Asian Games competitors for Saudi Arabia
21st-century Saudi Arabian people